Joyce Pamela Coates (born 14 December 1939 in Liverpool, England) is a former British pair skater who competed with Anthony Holles.  They finished tenth at the 1956 Winter Olympics, captured the bronze medal at the 1958 and 1959 European Figure Skating Championships, and came in fourth at the 1959 World Figure Skating Championships.  They retired from competition before the 1960 season, turning professional to take up coaching.

Results
(with Holles)

World professional pair skating champions 1962

References

Sports-Reference.com profile

British female pair skaters
English female pair skaters
Olympic figure skaters of Great Britain
Figure skaters at the 1956 Winter Olympics
1939 births
Living people
European Figure Skating Championships medalists
Sportspeople from Liverpool